Durlangen is a town in the German state of Baden-Württemberg, in Ostalbkreis district.

References

Ostalbkreis